Sadie's Last Days on Earth is a Canadian comedy film directed by Michael Seater, and starring Morgan Taylor Campbell, Clark Backo, Ricardo Hoyos, Munro Chambers and Paula Brancati. The plot follows a teenager who is convinced that the end of the world is waxing and creates a survival and to-do list.

Plot 
Sadie Mitchell (Morgan Taylor Campbell), a sixteen-year-old high school student is convinced the world is about to end, so she creates a list of skills she needs to master as a cook and another with personal interests like going to a party or kissing a guy. She does not want to be the only survivor and she really wants to get her best friend back before it's the end of the world.

Cast 
 Morgan Taylor Campbell as Sadie Mitchell
 Lola Flanery as Young Sadie Mitchell
 Clark Backo as Brennan
 Clarke Smith as Young Brennan
 Ricardo Hoyos as Jack Diaz
 Munro Chambers as Teddy
 Paula Brancati as Connie Nichol
 Hélène Joy as Hope Mitchell 
 Peter Keleghan as Roger Mitchell
 George Stroumboulopoulos as Gord
 John Ralston as Burt
 Emilia McCarthy as Robin
 Madison Cheeatow as Dee

Reception

Release 
The film was released on December 9, 2016.

Critical response 
Sadie's Last Days on Earth has received mixed reviews from critics, earning a score of 40% on review aggregator Rotten Tomatoes based on 5 reviews, with an average rating of 5.05/10.

Awards and nominations

References

External links
 

2016 films
2016 comedy films
Canadian comedy films
English-language Canadian films
Apocalyptic films
Films about earthquakes
Films based on urban legends
Films shot in Toronto
Films set in Toronto
2010s English-language films
2010s Canadian films